

Hans Stohwasser (4 May 1884 – 30 May 1967) was a Vizeadmiral in the Kriegsmarine of Nazi Germany. He was a recipient of the  Knight's Cross of the Iron Cross.

Awards
 Iron Cross (1914) 2nd Class (27 January 1915) & 1st Class (31 May 1916)
 Hanseatic Cross of Hamburg
 Military Merit Cross of Mecklenburg 2nd Class
 Knight's Cross of the Albert Order of Saxony 1st Class with Swords
 Wehrmacht Long Service Award 4th to 1st Class (2 October 1936)
 Honour Cross of the World War 1914/1918 (11 January 1935)
 Sudetenland Medal (20 December 1939)
 Clasp to the Iron Cross (1939) 2nd Class (26 November 1939) & 1st Class (22 April 1940)
 Minesweepers, Sub-Chasers and Escort-Vessel War Badge (1 September 1940)
 Knight's Cross of the Iron Cross on 30 November 1940 as Konteradmiral and Befehlshaber der Sicherung der Ostsee (Commander of the security of the Baltic Sea)

References

Citations

Bibliography

 Dörr, Manfred (1996). Die Ritterkreuzträger der Überwasserstreitkräfte der Kriegsmarine—Band 2:L–Z (in German). Osnabrück, Germany: Biblio Verlag. .
 

1884 births
1967 deaths
Military personnel from Dresden
Vice admirals of the Kriegsmarine
Imperial German Navy personnel of World War I
Counter admirals of the Reichsmarine
Recipients of the clasp to the Iron Cross, 1st class
Recipients of the Knight's Cross of the Iron Cross
People from the Kingdom of Saxony
20th-century Freikorps personnel
Kriegsmarine personnel of World War II